George Bryce (April 22, 1844 – August 5, 1931) was a Presbyterian minister and a prolific author, writing on many topics including history of the Red River Colony in what is now Manitoba, Canada.

Bryce was born near Mount Pleasant, Canada West (now Ontario).  He was elected to the Royal Society of Canada in 1902 and served as the Royal Society's President in 1910.

His younger brother, Peter Bryce, was a public health official.

References

External links

 
 
 
 Biography at the Manitoba Historical Society
 George Bryce, John Black, The Apostle of the Red River prairies 

1844 births
1931 deaths
Canadian Presbyterian ministers
20th-century Canadian historians
Canadian male non-fiction writers
Fellows of the Royal Society of Canada
Historians of Canada
Persons of National Historic Significance (Canada)